Leo Riuttu (5 June 1913 – 4 August 1989) was a Finnish actor. He appeared in 81 films and television shows between 1946 and 1978. He starred in the film Miriam, which was entered into the 8th Berlin International Film Festival. He is buried in the Hietaniemi Cemetery in Helsinki.

Selected filmography
 Kvinnan bakom allt (1951)
 The Unknown Soldier (1955)
 Miriam (1957)
 Skandaali tyttökoulussa (1960)
 Little Presents (1961)

References

External links

1913 births
1989 deaths
male actors from Tampere
People from Häme Province (Grand Duchy of Finland)
Finnish male film actors
20th-century Finnish male actors
Burials at Hietaniemi Cemetery